Indiana elected its members August 7, 1826.

See also 
 1826 and 1827 United States House of Representatives elections
 List of United States representatives from Indiana

1826
Indiana
United States House of Representatives